Robert James Nicholson (born February 4, 1938) is an attorney, real estate developer, and a former Republican National Committee chairman. He was the United States Secretary of Veterans Affairs from January 26, 2005, until October 1, 2007.

Personal life
Nicholson was born on a farm near Struble, Iowa. Nicholson has characterized his childhood as "growing up dirt poor in a tenant house without plumbing and sometimes without food". He is the brother of retired Army General John W. Nicholson.

Nicholson has a Master's degree in Public Policy from Columbia University.  He received a J.D. degree from the University of Denver College of Law in 1972.

Nicholson is married to the former Suzanne Marie Ferrell of Highland Falls, New York, who is an accomplished artist. They are the parents of three children.

Military service

He is a 1961 graduate of the United States Military Academy at West Point, New York, and served eight years in active duty.  He was a paratrooper and Ranger-qualified Army officer.  He fought in the Vietnam War, where he earned the Bronze Star, Combat Infantryman Badge, the Meritorious Service Medal with Oak Leaf Cluster, Republic of Vietnam Cross of Gallantry and two Air Medals. After thirty years of military service he retired in 1991 with the rank of colonel.

In 2005, he was awarded the Distinguished Graduate Award by the USMA.

Legal and business career
Nicholson practiced law in Denver, Colorado, specializing in real estate, municipal finance and zoning law. In 1978 he founded Nicholson Enterprises, Inc., a developer of planned residential communities, and in 1987 he bought Renaissance Homes, a custom-home builder. Nicholson is senior counsel with Brownstein Hyatt Farber Schreck LLP.  His practice includes public policy, health care, state and federal regulatory law, international relations, real estate, oil and gas, and alternative energy.

Nicholson is the chairman of Daniels Fund, a private foundation valued at $1.5B. He was chairman of the Federal Interagency Council on Homelessness, chairman of the Board of Open World Foundation, chairman of Volunteers of America of Colorado, and co-chairman of the Advisory Board of the Catholic Leadership Institute.  He served as a director of New Day USA Residential Mortgage, LLC; Federated Mutual Funds; the Horatio Alger Association of Distinguished Americans; St. Mary Land and Exploration Company; Blue Cross Blue Shield of Colorado; Community Corrections Corporation; ITN Energy Systems, Inc.; and Lerch, Bates and Associates, Inc.  He was a fellow of the U.S. Chamber of Commerce.

Nicholson has been honored with Honorary Doctorate of Public Service from Regis University; the University of Dallas, TX; John Cabot University, Rome; Ave Maria School of Law, Ann Arbor, MI; King's College, Wilkes Barre, PA; University of Denver College of Law; and the University of Rome, Italy. He gave the Commencement Address for the universities listed above, as well as the US Merchant Marine Academy. Additionally, he was recognized for by the Volunteers of America Ballington and Maude Booth Award for Public Service; President's Medal for Public Service, Georgetown University; Builder Hall of Fame by the National Association of Homebuilders; the Beckett Fund "Canterbury Medal"; Annual "Top Irish American Award" by Irish American Magazine; and Military Chaplains Association 2007 Citizenship Award.

Political career
Nicholson has never held elected office, but has long been active in the Republican Party. In January 1986, he was elected committeeman from Colorado for the Republican National Committee (RNC). In 1993, he was elected Vice-Chairman of the RNC, and was the "surprise pick" for GOP national chairman in January 1997. He served in that role through the 2000 presidential election.

Between 2001 and 2005, Nicholson served as United States Ambassador to the Holy See (the Vatican). In 2003, Pope John Paul II knighted him with the Grand Cross for his leadership on human rights issues and standing for religious freedom. Order of Pius IX.

In 2016, according to a Foreign Agents Registration Act (FARA) Short Form Registration Statement  dated October 21, 2016, Nicholson began working as “Senior Counsel” for the Ministry of Foreign Affairs for the Kingdom of Saudi Arabia. Working with other foreign agents hired by the lobbying firm of Brownstein, Hyatt, Farber, & Schreck, Nicholson's primary duties include facilitating & attending meetings with U.S. federal government officials on behalf of the Kingdom of Saudi Arabia.

References

External links
Official biography from the Department of Veterans Affairs website
 VIP Speakers Bureau, Jim Nicholson 

 Former Vatican Ambassador Nicholson sees wisdom of Holy Spirit in election of Pope Francis

|-

|-

|-

1938 births
Living people
21st-century American diplomats
21st-century American politicians
Ambassadors of the United States to the Holy See
United States Army personnel of the Vietnam War
American real estate businesspeople
Colorado lawyers
George W. Bush administration cabinet members
Iowa Republicans
Knights Grand Cross of the Order of Pope Pius IX
People from Plymouth County, Iowa
Recipients of the Air Medal
Republican National Committee chairs
School of International and Public Affairs, Columbia University alumni
Sturm College of Law alumni
United States Army colonels
United States Deputy Secretaries of Veterans Affairs
United States Military Academy alumni
United States Secretaries of Veterans Affairs